Panilla dispila is a moth of the family Noctuidae first described by Francis Walker in 1865. It is found in Sri Lanka and Taiwan.

References

Moths of Asia
Moths described in 1865